The Rio Acarí marmoset (Mico acariensis) is a marmoset species endemic to Brazil. It was first described in 2000.

References

Rio Acarí marmoset
Mammals of Brazil
Endemic fauna of Brazil
Rio Acarí marmoset
Primates of South America